Wheatley School may refer to:
in Canada
 Wheatley School, St. Catharines, an independent elementary school in Ontario, Canada

in the United Kingdom
 Wheatley Park School, a secondary school in Holton, Oxfordshire, England

in the United States
 Wheatley Public School, Poplar Bluff, Missouri, United States
 Phillis Wheatley Elementary School, New Orleans, Louisiana, United States
 The Wheatley School, a public high school in Old Westbury, Long Island, New York, United States
 Wheatley High School (Houston) (full name Phillis Wheatley High School), a secondary school in Houston, Texas, United States

See also 
 Bablake School, an independent school in Coventry, England, who alumni are known as "Old Wheatleyans" after principal benefactor Thomas Wheatley